The Order of the Oak Crown is an order of the Grand Duchy of Luxembourg.

History 
The Order of the Oak Crown was established in 1841 by Grand Duke William II, who was also King of the Netherlands.  At that time, the Grand Duchy of Luxembourg and the Kingdom of the Netherlands were in personal union in which both nations shared the same person as their respective head of state, though remaining as two distinct and independent nations. Although the order was legally a Luxembourgish honour, it was often used by William II and his successor, King-Grand Duke William III, as a house order of the Nassau dynasty to reward Dutch subjects, beyond the control of the Dutch government.

William II conferred membership of the order on fewer than 30 recipients.  His successor, William III, liked the ability to confer membership of this order at his sole discretion, and awarded 300 decorations on the day of his investiture alone.  In the following years, hundreds of additional awards of the order were made.  Indeed, there were so many recipients in the Kingdom of the Netherlands itself that the order was widely (and falsely) regarded as a Dutch honour.

Membership of the Order of the Oak Crown ceased to be awarded to Dutch subjects in 1890, when Queen Wilhelmina, as the only remaining member of the House of Orange-Nassau, succeeded her father as new Queen of the Netherlands.   Since the Erneuter Erbverein, the Salic Law-based house-treaty between the two branches of the House of Nassau (the junior branch of Orange-Nassau and the senior branch of Nassau-Weilburg (present-day Luxembourg-Nassau)), did not allow women to succeed to the throne of Luxembourg as long as male heirs of the House of Nassau (in both branches) existed, the throne of Luxembourg went to a German relative of the new Dutch queen, also her maternal great-uncle  Adolphe, Duke of Nassau,  who became Grand Duke of Luxembourg at age 73. The Order of the Oak Crown remained a solely Luxembourgish honour; subsequently, the Netherlands established the Order of Orange-Nassau instead.

Since the accession of Grand Duke Adolphe, the order has been primarily used as an award for Luxembourgish citizens, although membership has occasionally been conferred on foreigners, mainly on members of foreign royal families or on eminent foreigners with Luxembourgish ancestors.

The Grand Duke of Luxembourg is the Grand Master of the order.

Grades and insignia

Origin 
After the abdication of King-Grand Duke William I in 1841, his successor William II granted Luxembourg a written anti-liberal constitution (called the Charter) in order to strengthen his authority over the country. At the same occasion, he established the Order of the Oak Crown with the idea to be able to reward loyal supporters of his regime in liberal-minded Luxembourg.

The badge, the ribbon, and the (then) four-class hierarchy of the order were inspired by the Russian Order of St. George. This was probably due to the fact that William II was married to a daughter of Emperor Paul I of Russia, and that he had received the Order of St. George for his meritorious command in the Battle of Waterloo.

Grades 
Nowadays, the order consists of five grades:

Grand Cross – wears the badge on a sash on the right shoulder, and the plaque on the left chest;
Grand Officer – wears the badge on a necklet, and the plaque on the left chest;
Commander – wears the badge on a necklet;
Officer – wears the badge on a chest ribbon with rosette on the left chest;
Knight – wears the badge on a chest ribbon on the left chest;

plus gilt, silver and bronze medals, who wear the medal on a chest ribbon on the left chest.

Insignia 
 The badge of the order is a gilt cross pattée, enamelled in white; the Officer class has a green enamelled oak wreath between the arms of the cross. The central disc bears the crowned monogram "W" (for William) on a green enamel background.
The plaque of the order is (for Grand Cross) an eight-pointed faceted silver star, or (for Grand Officer) a faceted silver Maltese Cross. The central disc bears the crowned monogram "W" (for William) on a green enamel background, surrounded by a red enamel ring with the motto Je Maintiendrai ("I Will Maintain", now the national motto of the Netherlands), in turn surrounded by a green enamelled oak wreath.
The medal of the order is in an octagonal shape, with the motif of the badge of the Order without enamel on the obverse, and an oak wreath without enamel on the reverse.
 The ribbon of the order is yellow-orange moiré with three dark green stripes.  The colors are said to be inspired by the oak forests and the fields of rue of the Luxembourg countryside.

Recipients 

Grand Crosses
 Shinzo Abe
 Alexander, Prince of Orange
 Alexis, Prince of Bentheim and Steinfurt
 Anne, Princess Royal
 Beatrix of the Netherlands
 Joseph Bech
 Prince Bernhard of Saxe-Weimar-Eisenach (1792–1862)
 Xavier Bettel
 Otto von Bismarck
 Aníbal Cavaco Silva
 Charles XV
 Charles Augustus, Hereditary Grand Duke of Saxe-Weimar-Eisenach (1844–1894)
 Charles III of the United Kingdom
 Charlotte, Grand Duchess of Luxembourg
 Princess Christina of the Netherlands
 Winston Churchill
 Francesco Cossiga
 Charles de Broqueville
 Théophile de Lantsheere
 Laurentius Nicolaas Deckers
 Rudolf von Delbrück
 Édouard Descamps
 Augustin Dumon-Dumortier
 Dwight D. Eisenhower
 Giustino Fortunato (1777–1862)
 Prince Frederick of Prussia (1794–1863)
 Hans Globke
 Guillaume, Hereditary Grand Duke of Luxembourg
 Camille Gutt
 Dennis Hastert
 Henri, Grand Duke of Luxembourg
 Prince Henry of the Netherlands (1820–1879)
 Jean, Grand Duke of Luxembourg
 Jos van Kemenade
 Thanat Khoman
 Thanom Kittikachorn
 Marie-Pierre Kœnig
 Frits Korthals Altes
 Auguste, Baron Lambermont
 Edmond Leburton
 Philippe Leclerc de Hauteclocque
 Charles de Limburg Stirum
 Ludwig Wilhelm, Prince of Bentheim and Steinfurt
 Joseph Luns
 Sicco Mansholt
 Marcellin Marbot
 Princess Margriet of the Netherlands
 Jaime de Marichalar
 Wilfried Martens
 Désiré-Joseph Mercier
 Joannes Josephus van Mulken
 Nursultan Nazarbayev
 Jean-Baptiste Nothomb
 Oscar II
 Pieter Oud
 Maurice de Patoul
 Pels Rijcken
 Jan Jacob Rochussen
 Josef van Schaik
 Emil von Schlitz
 Poul Schlüter
 Willem Scholten
 Emmanuel Servais
 Walter Bedell Smith
 Dirk Stikker
 Ludwig Freiherr von und zu der Tann-Rathsamhausen
 Iñaki Urdangarin
 Achille Van Acker
 Victor van Strydonck de Burkel
 Pieter van Vollenhoven
 Frans Weisglas
 Wilhelmina of the Netherlands
 Willem-Alexander of the Netherlands
 William, Prince of Wied
 Johan Witteveen
 August zu Eulenburg
Grand Officers
 Jozias van Aartsen
 François Altwies
 Hubert Biermans
 Theo Bot
 Hans van den Broek
 Piet Bukman
 Léon Delacroix
 Jean Hengen
 Clarence R. Huebner
 Dolf Joekes
 Henk Kamp
 Marga Klompé
 Rudolf de Korte
 Henk Korthals
 Ernest Krings
 Pierre Lardinois
 Auguste Laval
 Astrid Lulling
 Lunsford E. Oliver
 Johan Remkes
 Carl Romme
 Bauke Roolvink
 Onno Ruding
 Job de Ruiter
 Norbert Schmelzer
 Émile Speller
 Kees Staf
 Edzo Toxopeus
 Anne Vondeling
 Berend-Jan van Voorst tot Voorst
Commanders
 Victor Abens
 Willem Albarda
 Marie-Claude Beaud
 Laurens Jan Brinkhorst
 Bill Davidson (businessman)
 Wim Deetman
 Anthony van der Eb
 Jean Favier
 Rudi Fuchs
 Leendert Ginjaar
 Emile Haag
 Aloyse Hentgen
 Harold Hinde
 Jan Kohout
 Cornelis Kruseman
 René van der Linden
 Peter Maurer
 Léon Metz
 Liz Mohn
 Jan Willem Louis van Oordt
 Jean-Baptiste Piron
 Mikhail Mikhailovich Pleshkov
 Gerard Veringa
 Joris Voorhoeve
 Joseph Weyland
Officers
 Father Jean Bernard
 Hugo Gernsback
 Jean-Marie Halsdorf
 Joseph Hollman
 Oscar Koch
 Nicolae Petrescu-Comnen
 Salomon Verveer
 Henk Vonhoff
 Tjerk Westerterp
 Piet van Zeil
 Knights
 Jules Mersch
 Daniel Nordlander
 Aat van Rhijn
 Jean Soupert
Gold/Gilt Medal
Silver Medal
Bronze Medal
Ridders (Obsolete)
 Christoffel Bisschop
 Jan Willem van Borselen
 Arie Johannes Lamme
Unknown Class
 Clare Hibbs Armstrong
 Alphonse Berns
 Rémy Eiffes
 Floris Adriaan van Hall
 Berend Heringa
 Henry J. Leir
 Perle Mesta
 Pierre Notting
 Théodore Pescatore
 Nico Ries
 Samuel Sarphati
 Nicolaas Scheltema
 Otto Schily
 Émile Servais
 Thaksin Shinawatra
 Albertus Willem Sijthoff
 Jan Szembek (diplomat)

References

External links 
 Legislative texts (French & German) :
 Mémorial A n° 1 du 3 January 1842, Arrêté royal grand-ducal du 29 décembre 1841, Litt. A, portant institution, pour le Grand-Duché du Luxembourg d'un Ordre de la Couronne de Chêne. (Foundation of the Order)
 Mémorial A n° 37 du 16 July 1845, Arrêté royal grand-ducal du 8 juillet 1845, N° 1395, statuant que les insignes de l'ordre de la Couronne de Chêne doivent être renvoyés à la Chancellerie d'État à La Haye après le décès des membres de l'ordre (Decorations of the Order must be returned after death or promotion)
 Mémorial A n° 1 du 6 January 1855, Arrêté royal grand-ducal du 2 septembre 1854 concernant les frais de l'Ordre de la Couronne de chêne (Costs of the Order)
 Mémorial A n° 6 du 23 February 1858, Arrêté royal grand-ducal du 5 février 1858 modifiant celui du 29 décembre 1841, portant institution de l'Ordre de la Couronne de Chêne (Creation of the rank of Officer)
 Mémorial A n° 28 du 5 November 1872, Arrêté royal grand-ducal du 28 octobre 1872 concernant les insignes de l'Ordre de la Couronne de chêne. (Gold medal replaced by a silver-gilt medal)
 Mémorial A n° 56 du 24 August 1876, Circulaire du 21 août 1876 – Ordre de la Couronne de chêne. (Return and wearing of decorations)
Honorary distinctions of the Grand Duchy of Luxembourg – Official website of the Luxembourg gouvernement

 
1841 establishments in Luxembourg
Awards established in 1841